Simon (Pimen) Fyodorovich Ushakov (Russian: Симон (Пимен) Федорович Ушаков) (1626 – 25 June 1686) was a leading Russian icon painter of the late 17th-century. Together with Fyodor Zubov and Fyodor Rozhnov, he is associated with the comprehensive reform of the Russian Orthodox Church undertaken by Patriarch Nikon.

We know almost nothing about the early years of Simon Ushakov. His birth date is deduced from his inscription on one of the icons: In the year 7166 painted this icon Simon Ushakov son, being 32 years of age.

At 22 he became a paid artist of the Silver Chamber, affiliated with the Armory Prikaz. The bright, fresh colours and exquisite, curving lines of his proto-baroque icons caught the eye of Patriarch Nikon, who introduced Simon to the tsar Alexei Mikhailovich. He became a great favourite with the royal family and was eventually (1664) assigned to the Kremlin Armoury, run by an educated boyar Bogdan Khitrovo.

Ushakov had a lot of pupils and associates and even published a short treatise on icon-painting entitled  A Word to Loving-Meticulous Icon Painting (1664). Some of the more conservative Russian priests, such as archpriest Avvakum, regarded his icons as "lascivious works of devil", for they were too Western for their tastes. Avvakum, in particular, alleged that Ushakov painted his "fleshly saints" after his own portly appearance.

Ushakov also executed secular commissions and produced engravings for book illustrations. In other words, he was one of the first secular painters in Russia. Some of his icons, transported to Western Europe, were instrumental in fomenting interest for nascent Russian painting. He died on 25 June 1686 in Moscow.

Chapter on Ushakov and his school from Igor Grabar's History of Russian Art
V. N. Alexandrov, History of Russian Art, Minsk, 2004,

External links

On-line text by Simon Ushakov ''A Word to Loving-Meticulous Icon Painting – in Russian
Simon Ushakov From Alexander Men' dictionary – in Russian

17th-century Russian painters
Russian male painters
Russian icon painters
1626 births
1686 deaths